The San Sebastian Stags basketball program represents San Sebastian College – Recoletos (SSC-R) in men's basketball as a member of the National Collegiate Athletic Association (Philippines) (NCAA). The San Sebastian Stags jointly own the longest championship streak in seniors' basketball, winning five straight titles from 1993 to 1997.

History

First titles 
Colloquially known as "Baste", the school has won 14 NCAA seniors' basketball titles. The Stags joined the NCAA in 1969; they won their first title in 1974 led by David Supnet, Jimmy Otazu and Benjie Cleofas. The Stags next title came in 1985; in 1988, the Stags then became the first team to win both pennants, finishing with a 10–0 record and an automatic title. San Sebastian was led by Eugene Quilban and Paul Alvarez. On the next season, the Stags faced the PHCR Altas in the Finals, averting an upset to win back-to-back titles.

Five-peat 
In 1993, San Sebastian began a 5-year title romp, starting with the efforts of Jesse Bardaje and Ulysses Tanigue, giving coach Turo Valenzona his first NCAA title. The Stags won the title again in 1994, again winning all 10 elimination round games, giving Rodney Santos the Most Valuable Player (MVP) award and Rommel Adducul the Rookie of the Year award. They next became the fifth team to win three consecutive NCAA titles, winning the first nine games of the season, only to lose against eventual Finalist Mapua. The Stags won all two games in the Finals though.

In 1996, the Stags were gunning for then unprecedented four consecutive titles. In the school's 50th anniversary,  Adducul was named MVP and led the Stags to a Finals sweep against the San Beda Red Lions. The Stags won a record five straight titles in 1997, winning all 13 games for a perfect season. Now coached by Bay Cristobal, the Stags had a Finals rematch with San Beda , whom they defeated easily. Adducul had another MVP year, and was backed by Banjo Calpito, Jasper Ocampo, Tanigue, Brixter Encarnacion and team captain Rommel Daep.

Turn of the millennium titles 
Two years later, the Stags were in the playoffs again, but were upset by eventual champions Letran Knights, who were the #4 seed, in the semifinals. The Stags made it to next season's Finals as #4 seed themselves, only to lose to the Benilde Blazers. San Sebastian broke through in 2001, beating the JRU Heavy Bombers in the Finals. In a Finals rematch with Benilde, the Stags won this time to win the title in 2002. The Stags failed to defend the title in 2003, losing to Letran. The Stags barely missed the playoffs in 2004 due to tiebreakers, but made it to the playoffs in the next year, only to lose to Letran in the semifinals. At this time, the Stags were led by Leo Najorda and Red Vicente, and coached again by Valenzona.

Pinatubo trio 
The Stags were not to make the playoffs until 2009; in 2008 coached by Jorge Gallent, they finished joint-2nd with 4 other teams, but a series of tiebreaking playoffs eliminated them from contention. Gallent resigned after the season.

In 2009, San Sebastian debuted three players from Pampanga, the so-called "Pinatubo trio" from Mount Pinatubo. Calvin Abueva, Ian Sangalang and Ronald Pascual, together with senior Jimbo Aquino and coached by Pampanga native Ato Agustin, the Stags finished joint first in the elimination round, and defeated three-time defending champions San Beda. The Red Lions defeated the Stags in a 2010 Finals rematch, and again in 2011, this time now coached by Topex Robinson. Robinson won the postseason 2011 Philippine Collegiate Championship, defeating UAAP champion Ateneo Blue Eagles in the Finals. The Pinatubo Trio, now coached by Allan Trinidad, lost to Letran in the 2012 semifinals. Coached by a returning Robinson in 2013, the Stags would have a semifinals rematch with Letran where they lost. Robinson coached the Stags to a losing season in 2014, after which he resigned.

Rodney Santos, part of the 1990s champion team, was appointed coach in 2015. Santos was sacked after coaching the rebuilding team to a losing season. Now coached by Egay Macaraya, the Stags made it to semifinals in 2017 led by Michael Calisaan and in 2019 led by RK Ilagan, but were eliminated in the stepladder semifinals by San Beda and Letran respectively.

Team roster 
NCAA Season 98

Head coaches 
 1992–1996: Turo Valenzona
 1997–1999: Bai Cristobal
 2000–2005: Turo Valenzona
 2006: Raymund Valenzona
 2007–2008: Jorge Gallent
 2009–2010: Ato Agustin
 2011–12: Topex Robinson
 2012: Allan Trinidad (interim)
 2013–2014: Topex Robinson
 2015: Rodney Santos
 2016–2022: Egay Macaraya
 2023–present: John Kallos

Season-by-season records

Notable players
 Calvin Abueva
 Christian Coronel
 Gilbert Bulawan
 Homer Se
 Ian Sangalang
 Jason Ballesteros
 JC Tiuseco
 Jimbo Aquino
 John Raymundo
 Johnedel Cardel
 Leo Najorda
 Rodney Santos
 Rommel Adducul
 Ronald Pascual
 Topex Robinson

References 

National Collegiate Athletic Association (Philippines) basketball teams